Rodell may refer to:

Rodell, Wisconsin
Rodell (surname)